Polyommatus myrrha is a species of butterfly in the family Lycaenidae. It was first described as Lycaena myrrha by Gottlieb August Wilhelm Herrich-Schäffer in 1851 in the six volume Systematische Bearbeitung der Schmetterlinge von Europa (Systematic research on the butterflies of Europe). This rare species has been found in Anatolia area of Turkey. and in the Zangezur Mountains (including both Armenian and Nakhichivan sides), which is inhabited by subspecies P. m. cinyraea Nekrutenko & Effendi, 1979.

References 

Polyommatus
Butterflies of Asia
Butterflies of Europe
Natural history of Anatolia
Butterflies described in 1851